Courtney Healy Henggeler (born December 11, 1978) is an American actress known for her starring role as Amanda LaRusso in the Netflix comedy-drama television series Cobra Kai. She is also known as playing the adult version of Sheldon Cooper's twin sister, Missy, in The Big Bang Theory.

Early life and education
Born in Phillipsburg, New Jersey, Henggeler grew up in Pennsylvania in the Poconos until she was 14 when she moved to her parents' hometown of Seaford, New York on the South Shore of Long Island. After graduating from Seaford High School in 1997, Henggeler enrolled at SUNY Fredonia but dropped out and moved to Los Angeles two years later, where she  received her first acting lessons. She credits her childhood best friend Patti for making her audition for a high school production of Carousel when she was in 9th grade.

Career
Henggeler started off her acting career with a main role in the horror B-movie The Bog Creatures in 2003. Two years later, she made a guest appearance in the medical drama House. In 2008, and again in 2018, Henggeler took on the guest role of Missy Cooper, the twin sister of Sheldon Cooper, in the sitcom The Big Bang Theory. After other guest roles in various movies and TV shows over the years and a recurring role on the CBS sitcom Mom, Henggeler made her breakthrough in 2018 when she landed a starring role on Cobra Kai as Amanda LaRusso, the wife of the original Karate Kid Daniel LaRusso. In 2019 she was featured in Hulu's episodic holiday horror series In the Dark.

Personal life
Henggeler married Ross Kohn in October 2015. They have two children. She is of Swiss descent.

Filmography

Film

Television

References

External links 
 
 

1978 births
21st-century American actresses
Actresses from New Jersey
American film actresses
Age controversies
American television actresses
American women comedians
Living people
People from Phillipsburg, New Jersey
21st-century American comedians
American people of Swiss descent